Mostafa Mahmoud Mohamed Selim  (born 17 March 1989), known as Mostafa Afroto, is an Egyptian footballer who plays as an attacking midfielder or a second striker. He currently plays for Ala'ab Damanhour SC. Mostafa is nicknamed "Afroto" (or Little Genie) for his speed, pace and unpredictable moves on the pitch.

Career
Afroto made his first squad club debut on 12 February 2010, when he came as a substitute for Osama Hosny in the 63rd minutes, when his team was down 0–1 against Ittihad El-Shorta. Afroto scored the equalizer for his club from a marvelous long distance free kick. He moved on to inspire his teammates to achieve a 4–2 win by gaining a penalty scored by his teammate Mohamed Samir and scoring his second goal in the 90th minute in an exciting come back. This his made the thrilled fans of Al-Ahly to chant his name until the end of the match.

On 21 August 2012, it was announced that he had officially signed for Azerbaijani giants Qarabağ. After only four games for Qarabağ joined Misr El Makasa on a two and a half year contract.

References

External links
Afroto at Footballdatabase

1989 births
Living people
Egyptian footballers
Egypt international footballers
Association football midfielders
Al Ahly SC players
ACS Poli Timișoara players
Qarabağ FK players
Al Ittihad Alexandria Club players
Misr Lel Makkasa SC players
Ismaily SC players
Egyptian Premier League players
Azerbaijan Premier League players
Egyptian expatriate sportspeople in Azerbaijan
Egyptian expatriate sportspeople in Romania